Henrik Nordnes (born 28 August 1980) is a retired Norwegian football defender.

He hails from Frogner i Sørum and started his senior career in Ullensaker/Kisa IL. Following spells in Skjetten SK and Follo FK he was signed by first-tier club Tromsø IL in 2007, appearing in six games in the 2007 Tippeligaen. He was injury-stricken, and loaned out to Ullensaker/Kisa before joining Strømmen IF. He retired after the 2013 season.

References

1980 births
Living people
People from Sørum
Norwegian footballers
Ullensaker/Kisa IL players
Skjetten SK players
Follo FK players
Tromsø IL players
Strømmen IF players
Eliteserien players
Norwegian First Division players
Association football defenders
Sportspeople from Viken (county)